This is a list of notable people from the Rhode Island School of Design.

Notable alumni

Academia

Business

Politics

Architecture

Interior design

Fine Art

Art collectives 
 Forcefield
Jim Drain (BFA 1998) — Artist
Matt Brinkman (BFA 1997) — Artist
Ara Peterson (BFA 1997) — Artist

Art collectors and art dealers
 Mary Boone (BFA 1973) — Owner of Mary Boone Gallery.
 David Whitney (B. Interior Architecture 1963) — art collector and curator; longtime companion of architect Philip Johnson.

Digital arts 
Rebecca Allen (BFA 1975) — Pioneer of early computer art, installation art, interface design, and professor

Guggenheim fellowships

MacArthur Fellowships

Multimedia, mixed media and installation

Painting

Photography

Printmaking

Sculpture

Fashion

Film and television

Actors

Furniture design

Glass

Graphic design

Illustration

Industrial design
David Hanson (BFA FAV 1997) — Robotics designer of Sophia (robot)
Charles Tsunashima (BFA Industrial Design, 1997, MFA Textiles 2000) — Industrial designer, Tama Arts University faculty

Literature

Music

Musical bands 
Bands formed by students while attending RISD

Black Dice – Formed in 1997 
Hisham Bharoocha (BFA 1998) — Artist and musician, former member of Black Dice and Lightning Bolt
Sebastian Blanck (BFA 1998) — Artist and musician, former member of Black Dice

Fang Island – Formed in 2005

Les Savy Fav – Formed in 1995 
Tim Harrington
Syd Butler

Lightning Bolt – Formed in 1994 
Hisham Bharoocha (BFA 1998) — Artist and musician, former member of Black Dice and Lightning Bolt
Brian Chippendale (no degree) — Artist, founded Fort Thunder
Brian Gibson (BFA 1998) — Artist
Rubber Rodeo — band formed in 1980

Talking Heads – Formed in 1974 
David Byrne (no degree)
Chris Frantz (BFA 1974)
Tina Weymouth (BFA 1974)

Textiles
Pia Camil (BFA 2003) – contemporary artist
Cynthia Schira (BFA 1956) — textile artist known for adding relief and irregularity to weavings made on a Jacquard loom
Ruth Adler Schnee (BFA 1945) — a founding figure of contemporary textile design in America and best known for her modern prints and abstract-patterns of organic and geometric forms.

Notable current and past faculty

Fine Arts Division
The Fine Arts Division includes the following departments; ceramics, film/animation/video, glass, illustration, jewelry and metalsmithing, painting, photography, printmaking, sculpture, and textiles.

Ceramics
 Otto and Vivika Heino — ceramics

Film, animation, video
Janet Perlman — animator, Oscar nominee for The Tender Tale of Cinderella Penguin
 Steven Subotnick — professor in animation
 Yvonne Andersen — professor in animation, department head

Illustration
 Fred Lynch (BFA 1986) — journalistic illustrator
 David Macaulay (BArch 1969) — Illustrator and author
 Barry Moser — Illustrator
 Kelly Murphy (BFA 1999) — Illustrator and author, E.B. White Award winner for Masterpiece
 Chris Van Allsburg — (MFA Sculpture 1975) children's book author/illustrator, Caldecott winner for Jumanji and The Polar Express
 Lars Grant-West — Illustrator for Wizards of the Coast

Jewelry and metalsmithing
 John Prip — silver design

Painting
 Richard Merkin (MFA 1963) — Professor Emeritus, painter.
Duane Slick — painting faculty since 1995.
 George William Whitaker — first instructor of oil painting
 Mabel May Woodward — painting faculty for over 20 years; during the early 20th century introduced the "action class," in which students studied the human figure as a machine rather than as a stationary object

Photography
 Diane Arbus — Photographer
 Harry Callahan — Photographer, former Chair of the Department of Photography
 Joe Deal – photographer, Professor Emeritus, former Provost
 Ann Fessler — author, filmmaker, installation artist, former Department Head and Graduate Program Director
 Henry Horenstein — Photographer
 Aaron Siskind — abstract expressionist photographer who, with Callahan, founded the photography department at RISD

Printmaking
 Andrew Raftery — engraver; has taught in the printmaking and painting department since 1991.
 Brian Shure — master printmaker, realist painter, teaching from 1996 to 2016.
 Carol Wax — printmaker, visiting artist and faculty in the printmaking department.

Sculpture
 Gilbert Franklin (1919–2004; BFA 1941) — sculptor, teacher between 1942 to 1985, and former Dean of fine arts.

Architecture and Design Division
The Architecture and Design Division includes the following departments; apparel design, architecture, furniture design, graphic design, industrial design, and landscape architecture.

Architecture
 Thomas Bosworth — former Chair of Department of Architecture; Seattle architect; Professor Emeritus University of Washington
 James Ingo Freed – American architect
Norman Isham — Rhode Island historical architect
Manfredi Nicoletti — Italian architect
Monica Ponce de Leon — architect, designer of the Fleet Library
Jane Silverstein Ries — first woman licensed in Colorado as a professional landscape architect
Galia Solomonoff — Argentinian-born architect
 Friedrich St. Florian — architect, designer of National World War II Memorial
Michael Webb —American architect

Landscape architecture 
 Mikyoung Kim — landscape architect
 Elizabeth Greenleaf Pattee  — landscape architect

Furniture design
 Tage Frid — RISD professor of Woodworking and Furniture design from 1962 until 1985 also connected to the industrial design program.
 Jens Risom — Furniture design

Graphic design
 John Howard Benson — Calligraphy, design theory, sculpture
 Malcolm Grear — Professor Emeritus, graphic designer
 Mihai Nadin — theorist, semiotics, computational design, HCI
 Ootje Oxenaar — Dutch graphic designer, designer of acclaimed but now vanished Dutch currency
 Michael Rock — graphic designer; writer; design professor at Yale University MFA graphic design program
 Nancy Skolos — graphic designer, co-founder of Skolos-Wedell studios, teaching at RISD since 1989
 Paul Soulellis — American graphic designer, artist, publisher and teacher; founder of Library of the Printed Web

Industrial design
 Marc Harrison — industrial designer and pioneer of universal design and RISD professor of industrial design until his death in 1998
Victor Papanek — designer and early pioneer of universal design
Peter Yeadon — Industrial designer

Experimental and Foundation Studies Division
 Dawn Clements — foundations faculty
Mark Milloff — painter, foundations faculty

Liberal Arts Division
 Mairéad Byrne — poet
 Jhumpa Lahiri — creative writing, author of the novel The Namesake

References

Rhode Island School of Design
People